Kwabena Frank Assinki (born 15 April 2002) is a Ghanaian professional footballer who plays as a centre-back].

Career

Inter Allies 
Assinki joined Tema-based club International Allies in 2018 and played for them in the Ghana Premier League prior to moving to Denmark. He made his debut in the 2020-21 Ghana Premier League season, making 12 appearances in 14 games before the league was brought to an abrupt end due to the COVID-19 pandemic. His performances in the league earned him one man of the match award within the season.

HB Køge 
In July 2020, International Allies confirmed that Assinki had been signed by Danish 1st Division side HB Køge on a 4-year contract, in the process joining his Inter Allies teammate Victorien Adebayor at the club. On 7 January 2022 Køge confirmed, that they had terminated the contract with Assinki due to a "personnel matter", with the explanation that he had "violated the values and rules of the club".

References

External links 

Living people
2000 births
Association football defenders
Ghanaian footballers
Ghanaian expatriate footballers
Ghana Premier League players
Danish 1st Division players
Danish 2nd Division players
HB Køge players
Ghana youth international footballers
International Allies F.C. players
Ghanaian expatriate sportspeople in Denmark
Expatriate men's footballers in Denmark